Memorial Hospital may refer to:


United Kingdom
 Memorial Hospital, Woolwich
 Scunthorpe General Hospital, Lincolnshire, previously known as the Scunthorpe and District War Memorial Hospital

United States
 Memorial Hospital (Chattanooga), in Chattanooga, Tennessee
 Memorial Hospital (Cumberland), in Cumberland, Maryland, opened 1888, closed 2009
 Guthrie Towanda Memorial Hospital, formerly known as simply Memorial Hospital
 Memorial Hospital (New York City, New York), a former hospital in New York City
 Memorial Hospital of Rhode Island
 Memorial Hospital and Health Care Center in Jasper, Indiana
 Memorial Hospital of South Bend in South Bend, Indiana
 Ochsner Baptist Medical Center (New Orleans), formerly known as Memorial Medical Center

Other countries
 Memorial Hospital, North Adelaide, South Australia, owned by Adelaide Community Healthcare Alliance

See also
 Memorial Medical Center (disambiguation)